Ellerport Airport  is a privately owned airport in Newman Lake, Washington. It is situated on five acres of land.

References

External links 

Airports in Washington (state)
Airports established in 1985
1985 establishments in Washington (state)
Privately owned airports